The 2015 Pan American Games in Toronto, Canada will be broadcast around the world, by Canadian Broadcasting Corporation (CBC), which will serve as the host broadcaster.

The home nation broadcaster was also the CBC, which will broadcast up to 600 hours of the competition and other material using 2 television channels (the main CBC channel and Radio Canada) and online streaming. The games broadcasting will be the most comprehensive coverage of Pan American Games history in Canada, and will also be the most extensive non-Olympic multi-sport event television event in Canadian history. The following Parapan American Games will also be broadcast in both official languages of Canada, English and French. Coverage will also be provided on television, radio and mobile.

Broadcasters

Brazilian broadcaster Rede Record paid $30 million US dollars to cover the games. This was an all-time record high.
The following is the list of official broadcasters in their respective countries.

References

Broadcasters
Broadcasters
Pan and Parapan American Games broadcasters
2015 Pan and Parapan American Games broadcasters
2015